Burakovo is a rural locality (a village) in Nikolotorzhskoye Rural Settlement, Kirillovsky District, Vologda Oblast, Russia. The population was 40 as of 2002.

Geography 
Burakovo is located 35 km southeast of Kirillov (the district's administrative centre) by road. Zarechye is the nearest rural locality.

References 

Rural localities in Kirillovsky District